"Shadow Boxer" is a song by Australian hard rock group The Angels, released in June 1979 as the lead and only single from the group's third studio album, No Exit.

"Shadow Boxer" first charted on the Kent Music Report Singles Chart on 11 June 1979, peaking at number 25 during a 14‑week chart run. It was co-written by band members, John Brewster, Doc Neeson and Rick Brewster.

Track listing 
 AP11934
 "Shadow Boxer" (Doc Neeson, John Brewster, Rick Brewster) - 2:40
 "Planned Obsolescence" (Doc Neeson, John Brewster, Rick Brewster, Chris Bailey, Graham "Buzz" Bidstrup) - 5:03

Personnel 
 Doc Neeson — lead vocals
 Rick Brewster — lead guitar
 John Brewster — rhythm guitar
 Chris Bailey — bass guitar
 Graham "Buzz" Bidstrup — drums
 John Brewster, Rick Brewster, Mark Opitz - producers

Charts

References 

The Angels (Australian band) songs
1979 songs
1979 singles
Songs written by Doc Neeson
Songs written by John Brewster (musician)
Albert Productions singles
Song recordings produced by Mark Opitz